Mantovani is an early American television series which aired in NTA Film Network syndication during 1959. It was a musical programme featuring British orchestra leader Annunzio Paolo Mantovani and his 46-piece orchestra, and hosted by John Conte.

The series was produced in England during 1958 and 1959, but was distributed to local stations across the United States. 39 episodes were filmed for National Telefilm Associates. According to Brooks and Marsh (1964), guest stars included Vic Damone, Connie Francis, and Dorothy Collins.

In 2019, Filmrise offered 20 restored episodes of Mantovani on their free streaming service.

References

External links

1959 American television series debuts
1959 American television series endings
First-run syndicated television programs in the United States